Captain Frederick John Bellenger (23 July 1894 – 11 May 1968) was a British surveyor, soldier and politician.

Early life
Born in Bethnal Green, London, he was the son of Eugene Bernard Bellenger, a dairyman, and his wife Isabella Annette née Henner. He received only an elementary education before starting work aged 14. He worked in various jobs: in a tea warehouse in Houndsditch, as a messenger boy for the Post Office and as a clerk to an export company in the City of London.

World War I

With the outbreak of the First World War in August 1914, Bellenger volunteered to join the British Army. He became a gunner in the Royal Field Artillery, arriving at the Western Front in the following year. He was twice wounded, and rose through the ranks, being commissioned as a second lieutenant in 1917. Following the armistice in November 1918, he served in the forces occupying the Rhineland. He was demobilised in 1919.

In Cologne he had met Marion Theresa Stollwerck, daughter of Generalkonsul Karl Stollwerck, a wealthy German chocolate manufacturer; the couple married in 1922. They had five sons and one daughter.

Early political career

Following the war, Bellenger worked as a surveyor and estate agent in west London. He became active in the local Conservative Association, and was elected to Fulham Borough Council as a Municipal Reform Party councillor representing Baron's Court ward in 1922 and 1925. He did not stand for election in 1928, and shortly afterwards joined the Labour Party.

In June 1930, Bellenger was selected by the Labour Party as their prospective parliamentary candidate at Bethnal Green South West, but withdrew his candidature a year later on health grounds. When the Labour Party split over the formation of a National Government in August 1931, he remained with the majority faction opposing the move.

In November 1933, he was chosen to contest Bassetlaw in Nottinghamshire, a seat held by Malcolm MacDonald of the National Labour Organisation and son of its leader, Ramsay MacDonald, a long-serving Secretary of State in the coalition National Government and first Labour Prime Minister. At the 1935 general election Bellenger gained the seat for Labour, and held it comfortably at each election until his death.

World War II
Bellenger remained in the army's emergency reserve, and when the Second World War broke out in 1939 he was automatically recalled to service. He was commissioned as a captain in the Royal Artillery in February 1940. He went to France as a staff officer in April of that year as part of the British Expeditionary Force. He returned to the United Kingdom briefly in May to take part in the Norway Debate in the Commons that led to the fall of Neville Chamberlain's government. Evacuated from France in June 1940, two months later he resigned his commission. Apart from his parliamentary activities, Bellenger wrote a column for the Sunday Pictorial under the byline "Voice of the Services".

Attlee government
When the Labour Party returned to government with a landslide at the 1945 general election, Bellenger was appointed Financial Secretary to the War Office. In October 1946, he became Secretary of State for War. Although not a cabinet position he was appointed a Privy Counsellor at the same time. He proved an unpopular minister with Labour backbenchers, and was attacked by those on the left of the party. It came as no surprise when he was removed from office at a ministerial reshuffle in October 1947.

Later life
Bellenger remained on the Labour backbenches for the rest of his life. He became increasingly disconnected from the mainstream of the party, being unsympathetic to trade unions, opposing the decriminalisation of homosexuality and supported the Unilateral Declaration of Independence by white Rhodesians. He was close to members of the Conservative Party, including their Chief Whip Martin Redmayne and, against the arguments of his dining companion, Margaret Thatcher, privately supported the retention of prime minister Harold Macmillan at the time of the Profumo scandal in 1963 along with Julian Critchley, another of his Conservative friends. Following the 1966 general election, the Bassetlaw Constituency Labour Party deselected him (for any future election) over his opposition to steel nationalisation and his position on Rhodesia.

Bellenger was still Bassetlaw's MP when he died at his Kensington, London, home in May 1968, aged 73. He had received the honorary freedom of the Borough of Worksop two days earlier.

References

External links 
 

1894 births
1968 deaths
British Army personnel of World War I
British Secretaries of State
British people of English descent
Conservative Party (UK) councillors
Knights Commander of the Order of Merit of the Federal Republic of Germany
Labour Party (UK) MPs for English constituencies
Members of Fulham Metropolitan Borough Council
Members of the Privy Council of the United Kingdom
Ministers in the Attlee governments, 1945–1951
Municipal Reform Party politicians
Royal Field Artillery officers
UK MPs 1935–1945
UK MPs 1945–1950
UK MPs 1950–1951
UK MPs 1951–1955
UK MPs 1955–1959
UK MPs 1959–1964
UK MPs 1964–1966
UK MPs 1966–1970
War Office personnel in World War II
Royal Artillery officers
British Army personnel of World War II
British Army officers